Cerosterna stolzi is a species of beetle in the family Cerambycidae. It was described by Coenraad Ritsema in 1911. It is known from Malaysia, Borneo and Sumatra.

Subspecies
 Cerosterna stolzi stolzi Ritsema, 1911
 Cerosterna stolzi brunnea (Fisher, 1935)

References

Lamiini
Beetles described in 1911